Governor Arthur may refer to:

Sir George Arthur, 1st Baronet (1784–1854), 37th Governor of Bombay
Harold J. Arthur (1904–1971), 68th Governor of Vermont
Oswald Raynor Arthur (1905–1973), Governor of the Falkland Islands from 1954 to 1957 and Governor of the Bahamas from 1957 to 1960